Orm Stórolfsson, also known as Orm Stórolfsson the Strong ( 1000 CE), was an Icelandic strongman who gained considerable attention during his lifetime for extraordinary feats of strength. According to legend, it took some 50 men to place the ship's mast on his shoulders due to its extreme weight and it was a nightmare to keep the log in balance because of its immense length. 

On 31 January 2015, the record, which had stood for over 1,000 years, was beaten by fellow Icelander Hafthór Júlíus Björnsson at the Strongman Champions League World's Strongest Viking competition in Vinstra, Norway. On 7 July 2019, as a part of the History Channel television series The Strongest Man in History, Brian Shaw, Eddie Hall, Robert Oberst and Nick Best attempted to lift a  log. Neither Shaw, Hall nor Oberst managed to budge it while Nick Best managed to momentarily hold it for half a second but failed to move the log even for a single step.

The name of Vormsi island (Swedish: Ormsö – "Orm's Island") in Estonia possibly refers to Orm Storolfsson.

References

Icelandic strength athletes
11th-century Vikings
11th-century Icelandic people